KPWB-FM is an FM radio station broadcasting on the frequency of 104.9 kHz; it is a Class C3 station licensed to the city of Piedmont, Missouri.

KPWB-FM broadcasts a country music format known as Kickin' Country 104.9.

References

External links 
 

PWB-FM
Radio stations established in 1986
1986 establishments in Missouri